Viktor Sergeyevich Konovalenko (11 March 1938 – 20 February 1996) was a Soviet ice hockey goaltender. He led the Soviet team to the Olympics gold medals in 1964 and 1968, to the IIHF World Championships title in 1963–1968, 1970 and 1971, and to the European title in 1963–68 and 1970. He was named the most valuable player in the Soviet league in 1970 and was inducted into the IIHF Hall of Fame in 2007.

Konovalenko played his entire career from 1956 to 1972 for Torpedo Gorky (now Torpedo Nizhny Novgorod); he never won a national title, and once placed second (in 1961). As a goaltender of the Soviet team he replaced Nikolai Puchkov, and in 1971, he was succeeded by Vladislav Tretiak. In retirement he worked as a goaltender coach with Torpedo Gorky and later became director of the Torpedo Gorky sports arena, which was renamed to the Konovalenko Sports Palace after his death.

References

External links

Viktor Konovalenko at CCCP International
A to Z Encyclopedia of Ice Hockey

1938 births
1996 deaths
Sportspeople from Nizhny Novgorod
Honoured Masters of Sport of the USSR
Recipients of the Order of the Red Banner of Labour
Ice hockey players at the 1964 Winter Olympics
Ice hockey players at the 1968 Winter Olympics
IIHF Hall of Fame inductees
Medalists at the 1964 Winter Olympics
Medalists at the 1968 Winter Olympics
Olympic gold medalists for the Soviet Union
Olympic ice hockey players of the Soviet Union
Olympic medalists in ice hockey
Soviet ice hockey goaltenders
Torpedo Nizhny Novgorod players